The Croscat is a volcano in the comarca of Garrotxa, Catalonia, Spain. It is both the youngest and highest volcano in the Iberian Peninsula, with the last eruption dated back to about 14,000 years Before Present. The volcanic cone has a horseshoe shape, and its northeastern flank was quarried for volcanic gravel until the early 1990s, exposing the internal structure of the cone from top to bottom. The volcano is located in the Garrotxa volcanic field, a Quaternary volcanic field also known as Olot volcanic field, as part of the protected area of the Zona Volcànica de la Garrotxa Natural Park.

Geology

A study published in 2011 at the Journal of Volcanology and Geothermal Research revealed that the Santa Margarida Volcano and the Croscat were the product of the same eruption event 11,500 years ago, alternating phreatomagmatic activity, between water and magma, and magmatic activity.

Human history
Starting from the 1960s, the northeastern flank of the volcano was quarried for lapilli gravel. The extraction of material from the volcano cone and the degradation of the volcanoes of the Garrotxa Volcanic Field sparked a series of protests in the 1970s to protect the volcanic field, a campaign that came to be known as Save the Volcanoes. The extraction area was also used as an uncontrolled municipal landfill for the city of Olot. In 1982 the Zona Volcànica de la Garrotxa Natural Park was created to protect the area but the extraction lasted for another nine years. Further protests were sparked after an agreement was reached between the  concessionaire of the quarry, Minas de Olot, SA, and the Generalitat of Catalonia for the further extraction of 2.7 million tons with educational and scientific purposes, with the commitment of restoration of all excavated areas. The successive non-fulfillment of the restoration program resulted in the issue of at least ten disciplinary proceedings in the subsequent years. The mining operations were stopped in 1991, when the Generalitat of Catalonia acquired the majority of shares of the mining company.

In the 1990s a territorial landscaping project was undertaken to restore the extraction site and the landfill to recover the morphology of the base of the volcano and the pastures surrounding the area. The project, which won an award for landscape design, minimized the landscape impact, prevented erosion and planned public access for educational purposes.

Gallery

See also
 Zona Volcànica de la Garrotxa Natural Park
 List of volcanoes in Spain
 Santa Margarida Volcano
 Lists of volcanoes

Notes

References

External links

Official Website of the Zona Volcànica de la Garrotxa Natural Park
Olot Volcanic Field - Global Volcanism Program
Croscat Volcano Clay Pits - routes on foot

Garrotxa
Mountains of Catalonia
Volcanoes of the Mediterranean Sea
Volcanoes of Catalonia